The Nuremberg Moot is an international moot court competition. Held partially at the Nuremberg Palace of Justice and organised by the International Nuremberg Principles Academy and University of Erlangen-Nuremberg, this competition now attracts around 60 to 100 teams from around the world annually, though not all are selected to participate in Nuremberg. Participants make submissions as though they are before the International Criminal Court. For the 2020 edition, owing to travel restrictions brought about by Covid-19, the tournament winner was adjudged by memorials only. Oral rounds were reinstated for 2021, but held online.

References

Moot court competitions